The 1987–88 Connecticut Huskies men's basketball team represented the University of Connecticut in the 1987–88 collegiate men's basketball season. The Huskies completed the season with a 20–14 overall record. The Huskies were members of the Big East Conference where they finished with a 4–12 record. They were the 1988 National Invitation Tournament champions. The Huskies played their home games at Hugh S. Greer Field House in Storrs, Connecticut and the Hartford Civic Center in Hartford, Connecticut, and they were led by second-year head coach Jim Calhoun.

Schedule 

|-
!colspan=12 style=""| Regular Season

|-
!colspan=12 style=""| Big East tournament

|-
!colspan=12 style=""| NIT

Schedule Source:

References 

UConn Huskies men's basketball seasons
Connecticut Huskies
National Invitation Tournament championship seasons
Connecticut Huskies
Connecticut Huskies
Connecticut Huskies